Lake Oron is a lake in eastern Irkutsk Oblast (Bodaybinsky District), Russia.

Geography
Lake Oron is connected to the Vitim River via a short waterway.

Hydrography
The presence of deep faults beneath Lake Oron strongly suggest that the lake has a tectonic origin, with a hydrological regime determined more by changes in precipitation than by glacier meltwater.

See also
List of lakes of Russia

References

Oron
Landforms of Siberia
Stanovoy Highlands